Oklahoma Creek flows into West Canada Creek in Newport, NYNewport, New York, in Herkimer County.

References

Rivers of New York (state)
Rivers of Herkimer County, New York